The Château Faugas is a château in Gabarnac, Gironde, Nouvelle-Aquitaine, France.

Châteaux in Gironde